Joseph Weintraub (1908–1977) graduated from Cornell Law School in 1930 and was Chief Justice of the New Jersey Supreme Court from 1957 to 1973.  He previously served as an associate justice of the same court from 1956 to 1957. Weintraub was Jewish.

See also
List of justices of the Supreme Court of New Jersey

References

1908 births
1977 deaths
Chief Justices of the Supreme Court of New Jersey
20th-century American Jews
20th-century American judges
Cornell University alumni